Bagleyston is a suburb of Johannesburg, South Africa. It lies north-east of the Johannesburg CBD and is surrounded by Sydenham, Rouxville and Orchards. It is located in Region E of the City of Johannesburg Metropolitan Municipality.

History
The suburb is situated on part of an old Witwatersrand farm called Klipfontein. It was established in 1947 and named after the original owner Herbert Bagley.

References

Johannesburg Region E